Hasanağa is a village in Tarsus district of Mersin Province, Turkey. It is situated in Çukurova (Cilicia of the antiquity). The population of village was 150 as of 2012. The major crop of the village is cotton.

References

Villages in Tarsus District